Klokovo  is an air base in Russia on north fringe of Tula. It has been home to 374 OVTAP (374th Independent Military Transport Aviation Regiment) flying Ilyushin Il-76 (NATO: Candid) and Antonov An-22 (NATO: Cock) large cargo planes, of the 12th Mginskaya Krasnoznamennaya military-transport aircraft division.

A scholastic regiment of Tambov military aircraft school (Aero L-29 Delfín (NATO: Maya)) was based there. The runway was used by the military together with a civil airport, which closed in 1992.

The base was used by the 374th Military-Transport Aviation Regiment between 1946 and 1975 and is currently home to the 490th Independent Helicopter Regiment.

References

Soviet Air Force bases
Soviet Frontal Aviation
Soviet Military Transport Aviation
Russian Air Force bases